St. Alban's Episcopal Church is an active parish in the Episcopal Diocese of New York, in the United States. The building is an historic Carpenter Gothic style church now located at 76 St. Alban's Place in Eltingville, Staten Island. It was built in 1865 as the Church of the Holy Comforter at what is now 3939 Richmond Avenue, the present site of the South Shore YMCA, and was designed by Richard Michell Upjohn, the son of the noted Carpenter Gothic architect, Richard Upjohn. In 1873, the building was split in half and moved to its present location, where it was re-assembled and expanded. In 1951, Holy Comforter absorbed the congregation of nearby St. Anne's Episcopal Church, Great Kills, and changed its name to St. Alban's. St. Anne's had been founded in 1929 as an offshoot of Holy Comforter.

On October 29, 1982, St. Alban's was added to the National Register of Historic Places. In 1984, it acquired an 1883-vintage Hook & Hastings organ, believed to be the oldest pipe organ that currently exists in a Staten Island church.

See also

Church of the Holy Comforter (disambiguation)
List of New York City Designated Landmarks in Staten Island
List of Registered Historic Places in Richmond County, New York
National Register of Historic Places listings in Richmond County, New York

References

External links
Official website
Mystery Worshiper review

Properties of religious function on the National Register of Historic Places in Staten Island
Carpenter Gothic church buildings in New York (state)
Episcopal church buildings in Staten Island
Churches in Staten Island
New York City Designated Landmarks in Staten Island
Richard Michell Upjohn church buildings
Relocated buildings and structures in New York City
Religious organizations established in 1865
1865 establishments in New York (state)
Eltingville, Staten Island